The 2016 United States attorney general elections were held on November 8, 2016, in 10 states. The previous attorney general elections for eight of the 10 states took place in 2012. The last attorney general elections for Utah and Vermont took place in 2014, as Utah held a special election due to the resignation of John Swallow, while the attorney general of Vermont serves two-year terms. The elections took place concurrently with the 2016 presidential election, elections to the House of Representatives and Senate, and numerous state and local elections.

Six state attorneys general ran for reelection and four did not. Missouri was only state that changed partisan control, where Republican Josh Hawley won the open seat, replacing outgoing Democrat Chris Koster. The four other open seats were won by the party which previously held the office, and all five incumbents who ran won re-election. Republicans expanded their majority control of popularly elected state attorneys general.

Results summary

Statistics

Closest races 
States where the margin of victory was under 1%:
 North Carolina, 0.4% (20,232 votes)

States where the margin of victory was under 5%:
 Pennsylvania, 2.8% (165,685 votes)

States where the margin of victory was under 10%:
 West Virginia, 9.7% (67,192 votes)

Partisan control of statewide offices 

Italics indicate office was not up for election in 2016.

Indiana 

Incumbent Republican Attorney General Greg Zoeller declined to run for a third term in order to run for the U.S. House of Representatives. Republicans chose Elkhart County Prosecutor Curtis Hill over former Attorney General Steve Carter, state senator Randall Head, and Deputy Attorney General Abby Kuzma at the Republican state convention on June 11. Democrats nominated Lorenzo Arredondo, former Lake County Circuit Judge. Hill won the election.

Missouri 

Incumbent Democratic Attorney General Chris Koster chose not to run for re-election to a third term, but instead ran for Governor of Missouri.

Former Cass County prosecuting attorney Tereasa Hensley was nominated in the Democratic primary over St. Louis County assessor Jake Zimmerman. State senator Scott Sifton also announced his candidacy, but withdrew before the primary in order to run for re-election. The Republican nominee was MU law professor Josh Hawley, who was nominated over state senator Kurt Schaefer.

Although early polling showed a tighter race, Hawley won the election by a wide margin, becoming the first Republican attorney general since William L. Webster left office in 1993.

Montana 

Incumbent Republican Tim Fox ran for re-election to a second term and was unopposed in the Republican primary. The Democratic nominee was state senator Larry Jent, who also ran for the nomination unopposed. Fox easily won re-election.

North Carolina 

Incumbent Democratic Attorney General Roy Cooper chose not to run for re-election to a fifth term in office, but instead successfully ran for Governor.

Primary elections were held on March 15. Democratic former state senator Josh Stein defeated Republican state senator Buck Newton in the general election.

Oregon 

Incumbent Democratic Attorney General Ellen Rosenblum ran for re-election to a second full term. She won the election over Republican nominee Daniel Zene Crowe.

Pennsylvania 

Incumbent Democratic Attorney General Kathleen Kane originally indicated her intention to seek re-election, but dropped out after she was criminally charged with violating grand jury secrecy laws stemming from alleged leaks of grand jury investigation details to embarrass a political enemy. Inspector General Bruce Beemer was appointed to fill out the remainder of her term, although he did not seek election to a full term.

Democratic candidates included Northampton County District Attorney John Morganelli, Montgomery County Board of Supervisors chair Josh Shapiro, and Allegheny County District Attorney Stephen Zappala. The Republican primary was between two candidates: state senator John Rafferty Jr. and former prosecutor Joe Peters. Shapiro and Rafferty won their respective primaries.

Governing rated this election as a tossup. Shapiro narrowly defeated Rafferty in the general election.

Utah 

Incumbent Republican Attorney General Sean Reyes ran for re-election to a full term after serving the remainder of John Swallow's term. He easily won the general election, defeating Democratic nominee Jon Harper and Libertarian nominee Andrew McCullogh.

Vermont 

Incumbent Democratic Attorney General William Sorrell, the state's longest-serving Attorney General (since 1997), did not run for re-election. Democratic nominee T.J. Donovan won the general election.

Washington 

Incumbent Democratic Attorney General Bob Ferguson sought re-election, opposed by Joshua B. Trumbull, who ran as a Libertarian. In the general election, Ferguson won re-election to a second term, defeating Trumbull.

West Virginia 

Incumbent Republican Attorney General Patrick Morrisey ran for re-election to a second term. He faced Democratic state delegate Doug Reynolds in the general election, with both being unopposed in their respective primaries. Morrisey won the general election.

}

Notes

References